Acronyms